Vibenshus Runddel station is an underground Copenhagen Metro station located at Vibenshus Runddel, at the corner of Jagtvej and Nørre Allé, in the Outer Østerbro district of Copenhagen, Denmark. The station is on the City Circle Line  (M3), between Poul Henningsens Plads and Skjolds Plads, and is in Zone 2.

History

Preparations such as wire work and archeological excavations began ultimo 2010 and construction work began ultimo 2012. The station was opened on 29 September 2019 together with 16 other stations of the line.

Design
The main staircase faces Vibenhus Runddel and a secondary emergency staircase faces the other way. The escalator shaft is clad with white panels with exposed undersides in the colours yellow, green, blue, red and orange. The colours are a reference to nearby Fælledparken.

Service

References

City Circle Line (Copenhagen Metro) stations
Railway stations opened in 2019
2019 establishments in Denmark
Railway stations in Denmark opened in the 21st century